Badovinci is a village in Serbia. It is situated in the Bogatić municipality, in the Mačva District. The village has a Serb ethnic majority and its population numbering 5,406 people (2002 census).

Name
The name of the settlement in Serbian is plural.

See also
List of places in Serbia
Mačva

Mačva
Populated places in Mačva District